Gwendolyn Angeline Albert Maria Rutten (born 26 June 1975) is a Belgian politician. She was the chairwoman of the Flemish liberal party until March 22, 2020. On 11 January 2017 she resigned from the Flemish Parliament in order to prepare her party for the local election of 2018.

Rutten was born in Hasselt, and read Law and International Politics at the Catholic University of Leuven.

She is also city councillor in Aarschot since 1 January 2007, and schepen since 1 January 2013.

Career
 2010–2014: Member of the Chamber of Representatives
 2014-2017: Member of the Flemish Parliament
 2012–2020: Chairperson of Open VLD
 2020–present: Member of the Flemish Parliament

References

External links
Official website

1975 births
Living people
Members of the Belgian Federal Parliament
Open Vlaamse Liberalen en Democraten politicians
21st-century Belgian politicians
21st-century Belgian women politicians